George Latunji Lasebikan (born August 1948) was the Anglican Bishop of Ondo in 2007, in Ondo Province of the Church of Nigeria.

Lasebikan was born in August 1948 in Ibadan, where he attended Ibadan Grammar School and Loyola College, Ibadan. He spent twelve years at the University of Ibadan, gaining Diploma, B.A. and M.A. in Religious Studies, M.Ed. in Guidance and Counselling and Ph.D. in Religious Studies specializing in the Old Testament. He also attended Lincoln Theological College from 1989 to 1990.

He became Deacon in 1984, Canon in April 1992 and Archdeacon in 1995; he left his post of Senior Lecturer at the University of Ibadan to become the sixth Bishop of Ondo in 1998.

He was elected Archbishop of Ondo Province in 2012 and he served 2 terms (the second beginning in 2016) as Archbishop of Ondo Province and also served as Dean of the Church of Nigeria, before retiring in 2018.

References 

Living people
Anglican bishops of Ondo
Anglican archbishops of Ondo
21st-century Anglican bishops in Nigeria
Nigerian Anglicans
University of Ibadan alumni
Academic staff of the University of Ibadan
Deans of the Church of Nigeria
Alumni of Lincoln Theological College
Church of Nigeria archdeacons
Ibadan Grammar School alumni
Loyola College, Ibadan alumni
1948 births